Motta San Giovanni is a comune (municipality) in the Province of Reggio Calabria in the Italian region Calabria, located about  southwest of Catanzaro and about  southeast of Reggio Calabria. In antiquity it had the Greek toponym Leucopetra (i.e. "white stone"). 

Motta San Giovanni borders the municipalities of Montebello Ionico and Reggio Calabria.

The most interesting feature of the comune is the Castle of Sant'Aniceto, a notable example of Byzantine-Norman architecture. The Capo dell'Armi Lighthouse is also located in the comune along the clifftops.

See also
 Capo dell'Armi Lighthouse

References

External links
 
 Official website

Cities and towns in Calabria